The Spies Who Loved Me is a South Korean television series starring Eric Mun, Yoo In-na, and Lim Ju-hwan. The series revolves around Kang Ah-Reum (Yoo In-na), a wedding dress designer, and her two husbands; ex Jun Ji-Hoon (Eric Mun) and current husband Derek Hyun (Im Joo Hwan), who both hide their real identities from her. It premiered on MBC TV on October 21, 2020, airing twice a week. It is also available on iQIYI for streaming worldwide.

Synopsis 
Kang Ah-Reum is a wedding dress designer who has been married twice. Her ex happens to be an undercover Interpol agent, while her current husband is an industrial spy. After a close friend is murdered for her involvement in the well-known EcoSun project, Ah-Reum seeks the help of Ji-Hoon and his team in finding out the truth, along the way uncovering dark and shocking secrets about those closest to her.

Cast

Main 
 Eric Mun as Jun Ji-Hoon, Kang Ah-Reum's first husband who is a secret Interpol agent disguised as a travel writer.
 Yoo In-na as Kang Ah-Reum, a wedding dress designer and owner of the shop Areumdaun Dress, married to Derek Hyun. 
 Lim Ju-hwan as Derek Hyun, Kang Ah-Reum's second husband and a cold-blooded industrial spy, who works as the CEO of an industrial spy agency.

Supporting

People around Jun Ji-hoon 
 Kim Tae-woo as Ban Jin-min, Director of Asian Affairs at Interpol's Industrial and Confidential Bureau. 
Jeong Suk-yong as Kang Tae-ryong, the head of the second Asia Branch of Interpol's Industrial Confidentiality Bureau disguised as a representative of the publishing company, Gulliver's Publishers.
Cha Joo-young as Hwang Seo-ra, an Interpol secret agent with an IQ of 157. She is the one who Ah-Reum believes Ji-Hoon had an affair with, though in reality, it was all a misunderstanding.  
Bae In-hyuk as Kim Young-goo, a junior agent of the Bureau disguised as the sales manager of the publishing company. The youngest of the team who specializes in analytics.

People around Kang Ah-reum 

 Park So-jin as Bae Doo-rae, Ah-reum's business partner and best friend, and the co-CEO of the wedding dress shop
 Kim Chung as Han Bok-sim, Ah-reum's mother and the hostess of the Dongbaekjudan
 Yoon So-hee as Sophie Ahn, a genius scientist in charge of the EcoSun Project, and Ah-reum’s friend. She is the informant that Ji-Hoon is looking for early in the series.

People around Derek Hyun 

 Jeon Seung-bin as Peter, Asia division industrial spy.
 Lee Jong-won as Tinker, an agent, M Classic Car CEO and a classic car restoration specialist.
 Kim Hye-ok as Hye Ra-sin, Derek Hyun's grandmother.

Others 
 Lee Joo-woo as Kim Dong-ran, DDK Group's second daughter and CEO of DDK Bora Food.
 Moon Ji-hoo as Doo-bong's underling
 Lee Ha-eun as Yoon Yeo-jung
 Jang Jae-ho as Kim Dong-taek
 Ji Hyun-joon as Jang Doo-bong

Special appearance 
Ahn Hee-yeon as Hacker (ep. 8-9)

Production 
It is the first drama by screenwriter Lee Ji-min, who has previously produced films such as The Man Standing Next, Forbidden Dream and The Age of Shadows. MBC confirmed the casting of Eric Mun, Yoo In-na and Lim Ju-hwan on June 22, 2020 in a press release that described the series as a "romantic spy drama". The main poster was revealed on September 29.

Original soundtrack

Part 1

Part 2

Part 3

Special Track

Part 4

Viewership

International broadcast
The series is available same time as Korea, as an iQIYI Original and exclusively on iQIYI globally (except China and Korea) with multilingual subtitles.
It is also available non-exclusively on iQIYI in South Korea.

Awards and nominations

Notes

References

External links 
  (in Korean)
 
 
 

MBC TV television dramas
Korean-language television shows
2020 South Korean television series debuts
2020 South Korean television series endings
South Korean action television series
South Korean romance television series
Television productions suspended due to the COVID-19 pandemic
Television series by Story & Pictures Media